Eugene Soule (born 30 May 1996) is a South African professional racing cyclist. He rode at the 2015 UCI Track Cycling World Championships.

References

External links

1996 births
Living people
South African male cyclists
Place of birth missing (living people)